Bruce Fisher (born January 8, 1954) is an American songwriter, record producer, playwright  best known for his collaborations with Billy Preston. Fisher's best-known songs include "You Are So Beautiful", "Will It Go Round In Circles", and "Nothing from Nothing", all co-written with Preston before 1973.

Career
Born in Washington D.C., Fisher was raised in Chicago, Illinois, by his grandmother. He moved to Los Angeles, California, in the early 1970s, where he currently resides.

Fisher's best-known songs include "You Are So Beautiful", "Will It Go Round In Circles", and "Nothing from Nothing", all co-written with Preston before 1973. With his first LP release, Red Hot in 1977, he worked with Roy Ayers, Keni Burke (with whom he wrote the title song), Charles Earland, Mtume and the Brecker Brothers in 1977. He also played and performed with The Blackbyrds, James Gadson, David Williams, Leon Ware, Carolyn Willis, Wah Wah Watson, Ernie Watts, the late Richard Tee and Bernard Purdie throughout the 1970s and 1980s. He also co-wrote and produced songs for the group 3 for 3 in 1990.

He also wrote and performed the title track to Quincy Jones' first gold album, Body Heat.

Recent activity
In recent years, as a managing member at Speak of the Devil LLC, Theatre Production, Fisher has been producing a play that he wrote entitled "Hear No Evil", starring Tony Award nominee Keith David, directed by Tony nominee Obba Babatunde, with musical direction by Harold Wheeler and costume design by Academy Award winner Ruth E. Carter.

Fisher has also seen the release of several songs on Leigh Jones' debut album, Music In My Soul.

Partial discography

Singles
"At The End Of A Love Affair" (United Artists 1976)
"In My Life" b/w "Starlight Starbright" (Mercury Records 1977)
"Red Hot" b/w "Money's Funny" (Mercury Records 1977)

Albums
Red Hot (Mercury Records 1977)
Wet Dream (Kryptics 1996)

As writer or co-writer

References

External links
Writing and Arrangement credits at Discogs
Extensive discography at Discogs
 

List of musical copyrights
http://www.hearnoevilthemusical.com

Living people
1951 births
20th-century American dramatists and playwrights
21st-century American dramatists and playwrights
American male singer-songwriters
American rhythm and blues singer-songwriters
American male dramatists and playwrights
American theatre managers and producers
American soul guitarists
American male guitarists
American funk guitarists
Mercury Records artists
United Artists Records artists
Writers from Washington, D.C.
Guitarists from Washington, D.C.
20th-century American male writers
21st-century American male writers
20th-century American guitarists
20th-century American male musicians
Singer-songwriters from Washington, D.C.